Nikita Eskov (born 23 January 1983 in Saint Petersburg) is a Russian professional racing cyclist, currently riding for UCI Professional Continental Team RusVelo.

Palmarès 

 2000
 3rd, Track Cycling World Championships Juniors team pursuit
 2001
 1st, Track Cycling World Championships, Juniors points race
 2002
 1st, Stage 2, Bidasoa Itzulia
 1st, Stage 2, Volta Ciclista Provincia Tarragona
 2003
 1st, European Track Championships, U23 Points race
 Track Cycling World Cup
 1st, Team pursuit, Moscow (with Alexei Markov, Alexander Serov and Sergei Klimov)
 2005
 Track Cycling World Cup
 2nd, Points race, Manchester

References

External links 

Russian male cyclists
Russian track cyclists
1983 births
Living people
Cyclists from Saint Petersburg